A Libyan is a person or thing of, from, or related to Libya in North Africa.

Libyan may also refer to:

 A person from Libya, or of Libyan descent. For information about the Libyan people, see Demographics of Libya and Culture of Libya. For specific persons, see List of Libyans
something of or related to Ancient Libya
 Libyan Arabic, a variety of the Arabic language (see also Languages of Libya)
 Libyan cuisine

See also 
 
 Libian, in the history of Chinese writing